The 1950 Kentucky Wildcats football team represented the University of Kentucky in the 1950 college football season. The offense scored 393 points while the defense allowed 69 points. Led by head coach Bear Bryant, the Wildcats were the SEC champions and won the 1951 Sugar Bowl over the 10–0 No. 1 Oklahoma Sooners.

The living players from the 1950 Wildcats team were honored during halftime of a game during the 2005 season as national champions for the 1950 season, as determined by the #1 ranking in Jeff Sagarin's computer ratings released in 1990. The University of Kentucky claims this national championship.

Head coach

Bear Bryant was known for having the most Collegiate wins of any head coach ever with 323 wins. 60 of those wins being at Kentucky. Bryant coached for Kentucky for a total of 8 seasons, 1950 being his fifth. After being inducted into Omicron Delta Kappa in 1949, Bryant went on to win his first Southeastern Conference Championship and Sugar Bowl as a Head Coach, before going on to win more with the University of Alabama and Texas A&M University. The Wildcats also had help from some other coaches. Carney Laslie, Frank Mosely, Ermal Allen, Clarence Underwood, Richard Holway, and George Chapman.

Stadium

	
McLean Stadium was a multi-purpose stadium open from 1880 to 1972, before the University of Kentucky replaced it with Kroger Field, formally known as Commonwealth Stadium. The stadium had a capacity of 37,000 fans.

Schedule

1951 NFL Draft

Awards and honors
Bob Gain, Outland Trophy
Bob Gain, All-America selection
Bob Gain, College Football Hall of Fame

References

Kentucky
Kentucky Wildcats football seasons
Southeastern Conference football champion seasons
Sugar Bowl champion seasons
College football national champions
Kentucky Wildcats football